Hugh Ryan "Jack" Conway (July 17, 1887 – October 11, 1952) was an American film director and film producer, as well as an actor of many films in the first half of the 20th century.

Biography

He was born as Hugh Ryan Conway, on July 17, 1887, in Graceville, Minnesota, USA. Conway started out as an actor, joining a repertory theater group straight out of high school. He then moved into films, and in 1911, became a member of D.W. Griffith's stock company, appearing primarily in Westerns. Four years later, he made his mark as a director and gained valuable experience at Universal (1916–17 and 1921–23), before moving on to MGM in 1925. He remained there until 1948, often helming prestige assignments featuring the studio's top male star, Clark Gable: Boom Town (1940), Honky Tonk (1941), and The Hucksters (1947) – all solid box-office hits.

Conway was one of a team of MGM contract directors, who forsook any pretense to a specific individual style in favor of working within the strictures set forth by studio management. A thoroughly competent craftsman, he delivered commercially successful entertainment, on time, and within budget. 

In his most famous film, A Tale of Two Cities (1935), he used 17,000 extras for the Paris mob scenes alone. This spectacular adaptation of the Dickens classic is still regarded by many as the definitive screen version. 

Another popular hit was the sophisticated all-star comedy Libeled Lady (1936), with the New York Times reviewer commenting on Conway's "agile direction". Conway also directed Viva Villa!, a hit MGM film starring Wallace Beery that was nominated for four Academy Awards.

Conway and director Edmund Goulding share the distinction of directing the most Best Picture-nominated films without ever being nominated for Best Director, with three apiece. Conway's nominated films were Viva Villa!, A Tale of Two Cities, and Libeled Lady.

Private life
His first marriage was to silent film actress Viola Barry. Together, they had two children, including writer Rosemary Conway. His second marriage was to Virginia Bushman, daughter of silent screen star Francis X. Bushman. They had two children, as well, including the actor Pat Conway. They resided in Pacific Palisades, California, in a house designed by architect Allen Siple (1900–1973). A street in Pacific Palisades, Jacon Way, is named for Conway. He retired from films in 1948 and died four years later at his home from pulmonary disease.

Filmography

Director

Her Indian Hero (1912, short)
House of Pride (1912, short)
His Only Son (1912, short)
In the Long Run (1912, short)
The Struggle (1913, short)
When Sherman Marched to the Sea (1913, short)
The Wrong Prescription (1914, short)
The Penitentes (1915)
Bitter Sweet (1916, short)
 The Mainspring (1916)
 The Measure of a Man (1916)
 The Social Buccaneer (1916)
The Beckoning Trail (1916)
 The Silent Battle (1916)
Because of a Woman (1917)
Bond of Fear (1917)
The Charmer (1917)
Come Through (1917)
A Jewel in Pawn (1917)
Polly Redhead (1917)
The Little Orphan (1917)
 Her Soul's Inspiration (1917)
A Diplomatic Mission (1918)
Desert Law (1918)
Her Decision (1918)
Little Red Decides (1918)
You Can't Believe Everything (1918)
Lombardi, Ltd. (1919)
 The U.P. Trail (1920)
The Dwelling Place of Light (1920)
Riders of the Dawn (1920)
The Money Changers (1920)
A Daughter of the Law (1921)
The Millionaire (1921)
The Rage of Paris (1921)
The Kiss (1921)
The Servant in the House (1921)
 The Killer (1921)
 The Spenders (1921)
Across the Deadline (1922)
Another Man's Shoes (1922)
The Long Chance (1922)
 Don't Shoot (1922)
Step on It! (1922)
Lucretia Lombard (1923)
Sawdust (1923)
What Wives Want (1923)
Trimmed in Scarlet (1923)
The Prisoner (1923)

Quicksands (1923)
The Roughneck (1924)
The Heart Buster (1924)
The Trouble Shooter (1924)
Soul Mates (1925)
The Only Thing (1925)
 The Hunted Woman (1925)
Brown of Harvard (1926)
Twelve Miles Out (1927)
The Understanding Heart (1927)
Alias Jimmy Valentine (1928)
While the City Sleeps (1928)
The Smart Set (1928)
Bringing Up Father (1928)
Untamed (1929)
Our Modern Maidens (1929)
The Unholy Three (1930)
They Learned About Women (1930)
New Moon (1930)
Just a Gigolo (1931)
The Easiest Way (1931)
Red-Headed Woman (1932)
But the Flesh Is Weak (1932)
Arsène Lupin (1932)
The Solitaire Man (1933)
The Nuisance (1933)
Hell Below (1933)
The Gay Bride (1934)
The Girl from Missouri (1934)
Tarzan and His Mate (1934)
Viva Villa! (1934)
A Tale of Two Cities (1935)
One New York Night (1935)
Libeled Lady (1936)
Saratoga (1937)
Too Hot to Handle (1938)
A Yank at Oxford (1938)
 Lady of the Tropics (1939)
Let Freedom Ring (1939)
Boom Town (1940)
Honky Tonk (1941)
Love Crazy (1941)
Crossroads (1942)
Assignment in Brittany (1943)
Dragon Seed (1944)
Desire Me (1947)
The Hucksters (1947)
High Barbaree (1947)
Julia Misbehaves (1948)

Actor

Roof Tops of Manhattan (1935)
 The Killer (1921)
A Royal Democrat (1919)
 Restless Souls (1919)
The Little Orphan (1917)
Macbeth (1916)
Bitter Sweet (1916)
Big Jim's Heart (1915)
Added Fuel (1915)
Captain Macklin (1915)
The Outcast (1915)
What Might Have Been (1915)
The Wrong Prescription (1914)
The Wireless Voice (1914)
Burning Daylight: The Adventures of 'Burning Daylight' in Alaska (1914)
Valley of the Moon (1914)
The Chechako (1914)
The Old Maid (1914)
The Claim Jumper (1913)
In the End (1913)
Patsy's Luck (1913)
The Trail of the Lonesome Mine (1913)
Good-for-Nothing Jack (1913)
The Struggle (1913)
Soldiers Three (1913)
Birds of Prey (1913)
When Sherman Marched to the Sea (1913)
Brought to Bay (1913)
A Child of War (1913)
Will o' the Wisp (1913)
The Twelfth Juror (1913)
When Lincoln Paid (1913)
The Old Armchair (1913)
The Civilian (1912)
His Only Son (1912)
The Boomerang (1912)
Sundered Ties (1912)
Uncle Bill (1912)

The Alibi (1912)
How Steve Made Good (1912)
The Obligation (1912)
The Soldier Brothers of Susanna (1912)
The Undoing of Slim Bill (1912)
The Bugler of Battery B (1912)
A Gentleman of Fortune (1912)
Hard Luck Bill (1912)
The Land of Might (1912)
The Squatter's Child (1912)
The Mountain Daisy (1912)
The Scalawag (1912)
The Sheriff's Round-Up (1912)
The Counting of Time (1912)
The Thespian Bandit (1912)
The Everlasting Judy (1912)
The Post Telegrapher (1912)
The Little Nugget (1912)
The Love Trail (1912)
Her Indian Hero (1912)
Two Men and the Law (1912)
Across the Sierras (1912)
A Pair of Jacks (1912)
The Fighting Chance (1912)
The Battle of the Red Men (1912)
The Empty Water Keg (1912)
George Warrington's Escape (1911)
A Painter's Idyl (1911)
Coals of Fire (1911)
John Oakhurst, Gambler (1911)
Arizona Bill (1911)
The Voyager: A Tale of Old Canada (1911)
Kit Carson's Wooing (1911)
The Totem Mark (1911)
The Sheriff of Tuolomne (1911)
Her Indian Mother (1910)
The Indian Scout's Vengeance (1910)
The Old Soldier's Story (1909)

Producer
The Girl from Missouri (1934)
Hell Below (1933)
Just a Gigolo (1931)
Our Modern Maidens (1929)

References

External links

1887 births
1952 deaths
People from Graceville, Minnesota
American male film actors
Male actors from Minnesota
Film directors from Minnesota
20th-century American male actors
Burials at Forest Lawn Memorial Park (Glendale)
Film producers from Minnesota